Brand New Strings is an album by Ricky Skaggs and Kentucky Thunder, released through Skaggs Family Records on September 28, 2004. In 2005, the album won the group the Grammy Award for Best Bluegrass Album.

Track listing

Personnel 

 Erick Anderson – Photography
 Sam Bacco – Percussion, Bells, Spoons
 Paul Brewster – Vocal Harmony
 Stuart Duncan – Fiddle
 Mark Fain – Bass, Bowed Bass
 Lee Groitzsch – Engineer, Mixing
 Rebecca Lynn Howard – Vocal Harmony
 Johnny Hyland – Guitar (Electric)
 Cody Kilby – Banjo, Guitar, Guitar (Rhythm), Soloist
 Brent King – Engineer, Mixing
 Star Klem – Wardrobe
 Tim Laure – Accordion, Portative Organ

 Andy Leftwich – Mandolin, Fiddle
 Andrew Mendelson – Mastering
 Jim Mills – Banjo
 Rupert Neve – Design Engineer
 Keith Sewell – Vocal Harmony
 Molly Skaggs – Dulcimer
 Ricky Skaggs – Guitar, Mandolin, Engineer, Gut String Guitar, Soloist, Claw Hammer Banjo, Hi String Guitar (Acoustic), Vocal Harmony, Papoose
 Bryan Sutton – Guitar
 Jeff Taylor – Accordion
 Darrin Vincent – Vocal Harmony
 Sharon White – Vocal Harmony

Chart performance

References

External links 
 Ricky Skaggs' official site

2004 albums
Ricky Skaggs albums
Grammy Award for Best Bluegrass Album